Hulcote and Salford is a civil parish in the district of Central Bedfordshire in the county of Bedfordshire. The parish was formed in 1933 by the union of the civil parishes of Hulcote and Salford. Until 1974 the parish was part of the Ampthill rural district.

References

External links

Civil parishes in Bedfordshire
Central Bedfordshire District